The Paramount Television Service (or PTVS for short and also known as Paramount Programming Service) was the name of a proposed but ultimately unrealized "fourth television network" from the U.S. film studio Paramount Pictures (then a unit of Gulf+Western, now owned by Paramount Global). It was a forerunner of the later UPN (the United Paramount Network), which launched 17 years later.

History

Background
PTVS was not Paramount's first attempt at launching a television network. The first attempt occurred in 1949 with the launch of the Paramount Television Network, which never extended beyond a few stations and folded after only a few years.

In 1974, Barry Diller started his tenure as the Chairman and Chief Executive Officer of Paramount Pictures Corporation. With Diller at the helm, the studio produced television programs such as Laverne & Shirley (1976), Taxi (1978), and Cheers (1982). With his television background, Diller kept pitching an idea of his to the board: a fourth commercial network.

The plan
Paramount Pictures purchased the Hughes Television Network including its satellite time in planning for PTVS in 1976.  They also hired Rich Frank of KCOP-TV and a member of the Operation Prime Time steering committee.  Plans relating to the proposed launch of the Paramount Television Service were first announced on June 17, 1977. Set to launch in April 1978,  its programming would have initially consisted of only one night a week.  Thirty "Movies of the Week" would have followed Star Trek: Phase II on Saturday nights. Planned too was a series derived from Paramount's version of The War of The Worlds (1953) as "backup" for Phase II; a pilot presentation was completed by the film's producer George Pal. PTVS was delayed until the 1978-79 season due to cautious advertisers.

At the time, Star Trek was being broadcast on 137 stations in the United States in syndication, and it was expected that the new television service would provide a single evening package which could be broadcast by these independent stations as well as Paramount's recently acquired Hughes Television Network. It was hoped that this station could become the fourth national network in the United States; Diller and his assistant Michael Eisner had hired Jeffrey Katzenberg to manage Star Trek into production with a television film due to launch the new series at a cost of $3.2 million – which would have been the most expensive television movie ever made.

The plans fizzle out
Despite Barry Diller's best efforts, the Paramount board, and studio chief Charles Bluhdorn, passed on the network, as Bluhdorn worried that PTVS would lose too much money.  Six months before the launch, Paramount canceled the network before PTVS was set to debut. Ultimately, Star Trek: Phase II was transformed into Star Trek: The Motion Picture (1979). Diller then took his fourth network idea with him when he moved to 20th Century Fox to start the Fox Broadcasting Company.

Beyond the Paramount Television Service
In the immediate years following the cancellation of the proposed network, Paramount would contribute some programs to Operation Prime Time, like the mini-series A Woman Called Golda, and the weekly pop music program, Solid Gold.  (Paramount Television didn't use its own television logo, in these cases; a different, darker logo—originally intended to be Paramount Television Service's station ident—was seen instead, it would be re-used for Paramount's home video division)

Paramount, and its eventual parent Viacom, didn't forget about the possibility of their own television network. Independent stations, even more than network affiliates, were feeling the growing pressure of audience erosion to cable television in the 1980s and 1990s, and there were unaffiliated commercial stations in most of the major markets, at least, even after the foundation of Fox in 1986.

Meanwhile, Paramount, long successful in syndication with repeats of Star Trek, with several impressively popular first-run syndicated series by the turn of the 1990s, in Entertainment Tonight, Hard Copy, Webster (which moved from ABC for its last two seasons), The Arsenio Hall Show, Friday the 13th: The Series, War of the Worlds (unrelated to the 1970s attempt)  and, perhaps most importantly of all, the two new Star Trek franchises, Star Trek: The Next Generation  and Star Trek: Deep Space Nine.

Paramount finally returned to the idea of launching a network with the creation of UPN, which launched in January 1995; as with the aborted PTVS, a new Star Trek series (Star Trek: Voyager) was launched at the same time as the network's flagship program. UPN eventually dissolved in 2006 when it merged with The WB (a rival network established by Warner Bros.) to form a new network, The CW. PTVS lives on through UPN and the Paramount half of The CW.

On February 9, 2017, Viacom announced that Spike would take on the new branding of the Paramount Network in early 2018, as the company switches to a focus on six prime ViacomCBS brands with most of the company's backing and resources.

See also
List of Paramount executives
Star Trek: The Motion Picture#Origins
Star Trek: Phase II
Paramount Television
CBS Paramount Television
Paramount Television Network
UPN
The CW Television Network
Fourth television network

References

Television networks in the United States
Paramount Pictures
UPN
Gulf and Western Industries